Svitlana Demchenko (born October 4, 2003) is a Ukrainian-born Canadian chess player. Svitlana Demchenko achieved the title of Woman Fide Master (WFM) in 2016 and now holds the title of Woman International Master (WIM) since achieved in 2019. She played on the Canadian Women's Chess Olympiad team in 2018 on the fourth board, scoring 5½/9. She competed in the 2021 Women's Chess World Cup, where she pushed 35th seed Karina Cyfka to tiebreaks in the first round despite being rated more than 300 points lower, losing in the second set of rapid tiebreaks.

References

2003 births
Living people

Canadian female chess players
Chess Woman International Masters